The KUKA Robot Language, also known as KRL, is a proprietary programming language similar to Pascal and used to control KUKA robots.

Features 

Any KRL code consists of two different files with the same name: a permanent data file, with the extension .dat, and a movement command file, with the extension .src.

KRL has four basic data types:

User can also create custom data types using enumeration. Enumeration and basic data types can be used to create arrays and structures.

Motion commands support several types of structures as data formats:

FRAME {X 10, Y 0, Z 500, A 0, B 0, C 0}

POS   {X 10, Y 0, Z 500, A 0, B 0, C 0, S 6, T 21}

E3POS {X 10, Y 0, Z 500, A 0, B 0, C 0, S 6, T 21, E1 0, E2 0, E3 0}

E6POS {X 10, Y 0, Z 500, A 0, B 0, C 0, S 6, T 21, E1 0, E2 0, E3 0, E4 0, E5 0, E6 0}

AXIS  {A1 0, A2 -90, A3 90, A4 0, A5 0, A6 0}

etc.

Robot joints are A1-A6.

External axis joints are E1-E6.

Frame value is sufficient to specify TCP location and orientation. But to also determine unique robot arm pose, additional info is required - S and T or  
Status and Turn. They are collection of flags stored as integer.

See also 
 RAPID

References

Sources

External links 
 KRL Reference Guide. Release 4.1

Robotics at KUKA
Robot programming languages